Aurichalcite is a carbonate mineral, usually found as a secondary mineral in copper and zinc deposits. The zinc to copper ratio is about 5:4. Copper (Cu2+) gives aurichalcite its green-blue colors.

Occurrence
Aurichalcite typically occurs in the oxidized zone of copper and zinc deposits.
Associated minerals include: rosasite, smithsonite, hemimorphite, hydrozincite, malachite and azurite.

It was first described in 1839 by Bottger who named the mineral for its zinc and copper content after the Greek όρειχαλκος, for "mountain brass" or "mountain copper", the name of orichalcum, a fabulous metal, mentioned in the legend of the mythic lost continent Atlantis. The type locality is the Loktevskoye Mine, Upper Loktevka River, Rudnyi Altai, Altaiskii Krai, Western Siberia, Russia.

Crystallography
Aurichalcite displays prismatic crystals often in the form of encrustations and sometimes columnar structures. The crystal system is monoclinic.

References

Copper(II) minerals
Zinc minerals
Carbonate minerals
Monoclinic minerals
Minerals in space group 11
Minerals described in 1839